The 2018 NHL Entry Draft was the 56th NHL Entry Draft. The draft was held on June 22–23, 2018, at the American Airlines Center in Dallas, Texas.

The 2018 NHL Entry Draft was the second of two professional sports drafts to be held in the Dallas–Fort Worth metroplex during the calendar year, as the Dallas Cowboys hosted the 2018 NFL Draft in April.

The first three selections were Rasmus Dahlin going to the Buffalo Sabres, Andrei Svechnikov being selected by the Carolina Hurricanes, and Jesperi Kotkaniemi being picked by the Montreal Canadiens.

The 2018 draft featured both the first player trained in England to be drafted in Liam Kirk and the first Jamaican-born player drafted in Jermaine Loewen.

Eligibility
Ice hockey players that were born between January 1, 1998, and September 15, 2000, are eligible for selection in the 2018 NHL Entry Draft. Additionally, undrafted, non-North American players born in 1997 are eligible for the draft; and those players who were drafted in the 2016 NHL Entry Draft, but not signed by an NHL team and who were born after June 30, 1998, are also eligible to re-enter the draft.

Draft lottery
Since the 2012–13 NHL season all teams not qualifying for the Stanley Cup playoffs have a "weighted" chance at winning the first overall selection. Beginning with the 2014–15 NHL season the NHL changed the weighting system that was used in previous years. Under the new system the odds of winning the draft lottery for the four lowest finishing teams in the league decreased, while the odds for the other non-playoff teams increased. The Buffalo Sabres, Carolina Hurricanes and Montreal Canadiens won the lotteries that took place on April 28, 2018, giving them the first, second and third picks overall. The Buffalo Sabres retained the top pick, while Carolina moved up nine spots and Montreal moved up one spot. In the process, the Ottawa Senators and Arizona Coyotes moved down two spots from second and third overall, respectively, while the Detroit Red Wings, Vancouver Canucks, Chicago Blackhawks, New York Rangers, Edmonton Oilers and New York Islanders each dropped one spot.

Top prospects
Source: NHL Central Scouting final (April 16, 2018) ranking.

Selections by round
The order of the 2018 Entry Draft is listed below.

Round one

Notes
 The Calgary Flames' first-round pick went to the New York Islanders as the result of a trade on June 24, 2017 that sent Travis Hamonic and a conditional fourth-round pick in 2019 to Calgary in exchange for a second-round pick in 2018, a conditional second-round pick in 2019 and this pick.
 The St. Louis Blues' first-round pick went to the Philadelphia Flyers as the result of a trade on June 23, 2017 that sent Brayden Schenn to St. Louis in exchange for Jori Lehtera, Washington's first-round pick in 2017 and this pick (being conditional at the time of the trade). The condition – Philadelphia will receive a first-round pick in 2018 if the Blues' first-round pick is outside of the top ten selections – was converted on April 28, 2018.
 The Pittsburgh Penguins' first-round pick went to the New York Rangers as the result of a trade on June 22, 2018 that sent Boston's first-round pick and New Jersey's second-round pick (26th and 48th overall) both in 2018 to Ottawa in exchange for this pick.
Ottawa previously acquired this pick as the result of a trade on February 23, 2018 that sent Derick Brassard and a third-round pick in 2018 to Pittsburgh in exchange for Ian Cole, Filip Gustavsson and this pick.
 The Toronto Maple Leafs' first-round pick went to the St. Louis Blues as the result of a trade on June 22, 2018 that sent Winnipeg's first-round pick in 2018 (29th overall) and a third-round pick in 2018 (76th overall) to Toronto in exchange for this pick.
 The Boston Bruins' first-round pick went to the Ottawa Senators as the result of a trade on June 22, 2018 that sent Pittsburgh's first-round pick in 2018 (22nd overall) to the New York Rangers in exchange for New Jersey's second-round pick in 2018 (48th overall) and this pick.
The Rangers previously acquired this pick as the result of a trade on February 25, 2018 that sent Rick Nash to Boston in exchange for Ryan Spooner, Matt Beleskey, Ryan Lindgren, a seventh-round pick in 2019 and this pick.
 The Nashville Predators' first-round pick went to the Chicago Blackhawks as the result of a trade on February 26, 2018 that sent Ryan Hartman and a fifth-round pick in 2018 to Nashville in exchange for Victor Ejdsell, a fourth-round pick in 2018 and this pick.
 The Tampa Bay Lightning's first-round pick went to the New York Rangers as the result of a trade on February 26, 2018 that sent Ryan McDonagh and J.T. Miller to Tampa Bay in exchange for Vladislav Namestnikov, Libor Hajek, Brett Howden, a conditional first-round pick in 2019 and this pick.
 The Winnipeg Jets' first-round pick went to the Toronto Maple Leafs as the result of a trade on June 22, 2018 that sent a first-round pick in 2018 (25th overall) to St. Louis in exchange for a third-round pick in 2018 (76th overall) and this pick.
St. Louis previously acquired this pick as the result of a trade on February 26, 2018 that sent Paul Stastny to Winnipeg in exchange for Erik Foley, a conditional fourth-round pick in 2020 and this pick (being conditional at the time of the trade). The condition – St. Louis will receive a first-round pick in 2018 if the Jets' first-round pick in 2018 is outside of the top three selections – was converted when the Jets qualified for the 2018 Stanley Cup playoffs on March 25, 2018.
 The Vegas Golden Knights' first-round pick went to the Detroit Red Wings as the result of a trade on February 26, 2018 that sent Tomas Tatar to Vegas in exchange for the Islanders' second-round pick in 2019, a third-round pick in 2021 and this pick.

Round two

Notes
 The Ottawa Senators' second-round pick went to the Detroit Red Wings as the result of a trade on February 28, 2017 that sent Brendan Smith to the New York Rangers in exchange for a third-round pick in 2017 and this pick.
The Rangers previously acquired this pick as the result of a trade on July 18, 2016 that sent Derick Brassard and a seventh-round pick in 2018 to Ottawa in exchange for Mika Zibanejad and this pick.
 The Arizona Coyotes' second-round pick went to the Florida Panthers as the result of a trade on August 25, 2016 that sent Dave Bolland and Lawson Crouse to Arizona in exchange for a third-round pick in 2017 and this pick (being conditional at the time of the trade). The condition – Florida will receive a second-round pick in 2018 if Crouse plays in 10 or more games for Arizona in the 2016–17 season – was converted on November 10, 2016.
 The Chicago Blackhawks' second-round pick went to the Montreal Canadiens as the result of a trade on February 26, 2016 that sent Tomas Fleischmann and Dale Weise to Chicago in exchange for Phillip Danault and this pick.
 The Calgary Flames' second-round pick went to the New York Islanders as the result of a trade on June 24, 2017 that sent Travis Hamonic and a conditional fourth-round pick in 2019 to Calgary in exchange for a first-round pick in 2018, a conditional second-round pick in 2019 and this pick.
 The Florida Panthers' second-round pick went the Washington Capitals as the result of a trade on July 2, 2017 that sent Marcus Johansson to New Jersey in exchange for Toronto's third-round pick in 2018 and this pick.
New Jersey previously acquired this pick as the result of a trade on June 10, 2016 that sent Paul Thompson and Graham Black to Florida in exchange for Marc Savard and this pick.
 The Colorado Avalanche's second-round pick went to the Washington Capitals as the result of a trade on June 22, 2018 that sent Philipp Grubauer and Brooks Orpik to Colorado in exchange for this pick.
 The New Jersey Devils' second-round pick went to the Ottawa Senators as the result of a trade on June 22, 2018 that sent Pittsburgh's first-round pick in 2018 (22nd overall) to the New York Rangers in exchange for Boston's first-round pick in 2018 (26th overall) and this pick.
The Rangers previously acquired this pick as the result of a trade on February 22, 2018 that sent Michael Grabner to New Jersey in exchange for Yegor Rykov and this pick.
 The San Jose Sharks' second-round pick went to the Toronto Maple Leafs as the result of a trade on February 22, 2016 that sent Roman Polak and Nick Spaling to San Jose in exchange for Raffi Torres, a second-round pick in 2017 and this pick.
 The Minnesota Wild's second-round pick went to the Arizona Coyotes as the result of a trade on February 26, 2017 that sent Martin Hanzal, Ryan White and a fourth-round pick in 2017 to Minnesota in exchange for Grayson Downing, a first-round pick in 2017, a conditional fourth-round pick in 2019 and this pick.
 The Toronto Maple Leafs' second-round pick went to the Montreal Canadiens as the result of a trade on February 25, 2018 that sent Tomas Plekanec and Kyle Baun to Toronto in exchange for Kerby Rychel, Rinat Valiev and this pick.
 The Nashville Predators' second-round pick went to the Pittsburgh Penguins as the result of a trade on June 23, 2018 that sent Ottawa's third-round pick and a fifth-round pick both in 2018 (64th and 146th overall) to Colorado in exchange for this pick.
Colorado previously acquired this pick as the result of a trade on November 5, 2017 that sent Kyle Turris to Nashville in exchange for Samuel Girard, Vladislav Kamenev and this pick.
 The Washington Capitals' second-round pick went to the Edmonton Oilers as the result of a trade on June 23, 2018 that sent a third and fifth-round pick both in 2018 (71st and 133rd overall) to Montreal in exchange for this pick.
Montreal previously acquired this pick as the result of a trade on June 24, 2016 that sent Lars Eller to Washington in exchange for a second-round pick in 2017 and this pick.

Round three

Notes
 The Buffalo Sabres' third-round pick went to the Minnesota Wild as the result of a trade on June 30, 2017 that sent Jason Pominville, Marco Scandella and a fourth-round pick in 2018 to Buffalo in exchange for Tyler Ennis, Marcus Foligno and this pick.
 The Ottawa Senators' third-round pick went to the Colorado Avalanche as the result of a trade on June 23, 2018 that sent Nashville's second-round pick in 2018 (58th overall) to Pittsburgh in exchange for a fifth-round pick in 2018 (146th overall) and this pick.
Pittsburgh previously acquired this pick as the result of a trade on February 23, 2018 that sent Ian Cole, Filip Gustavsson and a first-round pick in 2018 to Ottawa in exchange for Vincent Dunn and this pick.
 The Edmonton Oilers' third-round pick went to the Montreal Canadiens as the result of a trade on June 23, 2018 that sent Washington's second-round pick in 2018 (62nd overall) to Edmonton in exchange for a fifth-round pick in 2018 (133rd overall) and this pick.
 The Carolina Hurricanes' third-round pick went to the Arizona Coyotes as the result of a trade on May 3, 2018 that sent Jordan Martinook and a fourth-round pick in 2018 to Carolina in exchange for Marcus Kruger and this pick.
 The Calgary Flames' third-round pick went to the Chicago Blackhawks as the result of a trade on June 23, 2018 that sent Toronto's third-round pick and Columbus' fifth-round pick both in 2018 (87th and 142nd overall) to Arizona in exchange for this pick.
Arizona previously acquired this pick as the result of a trade on June 17, 2017 that sent Mike Smith to Calgary in exchange for Chad Johnson, Brandon Hickey and this pick (being conditional at the time of the trade). The condition – Arizona will receive a third-round pick in 2018 if Calgary fails to qualify for the 2018 Stanley Cup playoffs – was converted on March 26, 2018.
 The St. Louis Blues' third-round pick went the Toronto Maple Leafs as the result of a trade on June 22, 2018 that sent a first-round pick in 2018 (25th overall) to St. Louis in exchange for Winnipeg's first-round pick in 2018 (29th overall) and this pick.
 The Florida Panthers' third-round pick went to the Boston Bruins as the result of a trade on February 22, 2018 that sent Frank Vatrano to Florida in exchange for this pick.
 The New Jersey Devils' third-round pick went to the Anaheim Ducks as the result of a trade on November 30, 2017 that sent Sami Vatanen and a conditional third-round pick in 2019 or 2020 to New Jersey in exchange for Adam Henrique, Joseph Blandisi and this pick.
 The Philadelphia Flyers' third-round pick went to the Detroit Red Wings as the result of a trade on February 19, 2018 that sent Petr Mrazek to Philadelphia in exchange for a conditional third-round pick in 2019 and this pick (being conditional at the time of the trade). The condition – Detroit will receive a third-round pick in 2018 if the Flyers qualify for the 2018 Stanley Cup playoffs and Mrazek wins five regular season games – was converted on April 7, 2018.
 The San Jose Sharks' third-round pick went to the Toronto Maple Leafs as the result of a trade on February 27, 2016 that sent James Reimer and Jeremy Morin to San Jose in exchange for Alex Stalock, Ben Smith and this pick (being conditional at the time of the trade). The condition – Toronto will receive a third-round pick in 2018 if the Sharks qualify for the 2016 Stanley Cup Finals – was converted on May 25, 2016.
 The Pittsburgh Penguins' third-round pick went to the Detroit Red Wings as the result of a trade on October 21, 2017 that sent Riley Sheahan and a fifth-round pick in 2018 to Pittsburgh in exchange for Scott Wilson and this pick.
 The Toronto Maple Leafs' third-round pick went to the San Jose Sharks as the result of a trade on June 23, 2018 that sent a fourth and fifth-round pick both in 2018 (114th and 145th overall) to Arizona in exchange for this pick.
Arizona previously acquired this pick as the result of a trade June 23, 2018 that sent Calgary's third-round pick in 2018 (74th overall) to Chicago in exchange for Columbus' fifth-round pick in 2018 (142nd overall) and this pick.
Chicago previously acquired this pick as the result of a trade on February 19, 2018 that sent Michal Kempny to Washington in exchange for this pick (being conditional at the time of the trade). The condition – Chicago will receive the higher of Toronto or Washington's third-round pick in 2018 – was converted on April 25, 2018 when Toronto was eliminated from the 2018 Stanley Cup playoffs ensuring that Toronto would select higher than Washington.
Washington previously acquired this pick as the result of a trade on July 2, 2017 that sent Marcus Johansson to New Jersey in exchange for Florida's second-round pick in 2018 and this pick.
New Jersey previously acquired this pick as compensation for Toronto hiring Lou Lamoriello as their general manager on July 23, 2015.
 The Boston Bruins' third-round pick went to the New York Rangers as the result of a trade on February 20, 2018 that sent Nick Holden to Boston in exchange for Rob O'Gara and this pick.
 The Nashville Predators' third-round pick went to the Florida Panthers as the result of a trade on June 23, 2018 that sent a third-round pick in 2019 to Nashville in exchange for this pick.
 The Vegas Golden Knights' third-round pick went to the Minnesota Wild as the result of a trade on June 21, 2017 that sent Alex Tuch to Vegas in exchange for this pick (being conditional at the time of the trade). The condition – Minnesota will receive a third-round pick in 2018 if Vegas does not acquire any additional third-round picks in 2017 – was converted on June 24, 2017.

Round four

Notes
 The Arizona Coyotes' fourth-round pick went to the Carolina Hurricanes as the result of a trade on May 3, 2018 that sent Marcus Kruger and a third-round pick in 2018 to Arizona in exchange for Jordan Martinook and this pick.
 The Montreal Canadiens' fourth-round pick was re-acquired as the result of a trade on November 23, 2017 that sent Torrey Mitchell to Los Angeles in exchange for this pick (being conditional at the time of the trade). The condition – Montreal will receive Montreal's fourth-round pick in 2018 if Los Angeles qualifies for the 2018 Stanley Cup playoffs – was converted on April 4, 2018.
Los Angeles previously acquired this pick as the result of a trade on March 1, 2017 that sent Dwight King to Montreal in exchange for this pick (being conditional at the time of the trade) The condition – Los Angeles will receive a fourth-round pick in 2018 if King does not re-sign with Montreal for the 2017–18 NHL season – was converted on June 22, 2017.
 The Vancouver Canucks' fourth-round pick went to the Vegas Golden Knights as the result of a trade on February 23, 2018 that sent Derick Brassard to Pittsburgh in exchange for Ryan Reaves and this pick.
Pittsburgh previously acquired this pick as the result of a trade on October 3, 2017 that sent Derrick Pouliot to Vancouver in exchange for Andrey Pedan and this pick.
 The Chicago Blackhawks' fourth-round pick went to the Dallas Stars as the result of a trade on February 28, 2017 that sent Johnny Oduya to Chicago in exchange for Mark McNeill and this pick (being conditional at the time of the trade). The condition – Dallas will receive a fourth-round pick in 2018 if Chicago fails to advance to the 2017 Western Conference Final – was converted on April 20, 2017 when Chicago was eliminated from the playoffs.
 The Edmonton Oilers' fourth-round pick went to the San Jose Sharks as the result of a trade on June 23, 2018 that sent Vegas' fourth-round pick and Florida's fifth-round pick both in 2018 (123rd and 139th overall) to Montreal in exchange for this pick.
Montreal previously acquired this pick as the result of a trade on January 4, 2018 that sent Al Montoya to Edmonton in exchange for this pick (being conditional at the time of the trade). The condition – Montreal will receive a fourth-round pick in 2018 if Montoya plays in seven or more games for the Oilers during the 2017–18 NHL season – was converted on March 14, 2018.
 The Florida Panthers' fourth-round pick went to the Calgary Flames as the result of a trade on February 27, 2016 that sent Jiri Hudler to Florida in exchange for a second-round pick in 2016 and this pick.
 The Columbus Blue Jackets' fourth-round pick went to the Nashville Predators as the result of a trade on February 25, 2018 that sent Mark Letestu to Columbus in exchange for this pick.
 The San Jose Sharks' fourth-round pick went to the Arizona Coyotes as the result of a trade on June 23, 2018 that sent Toronto's third-round pick in 2018 (87th overall) to San Jose in exchange for a fifth-round pick in 2018 (145th overall) and this pick.
 The Pittsburgh Penguins' fourth-round pick went to the Vegas Golden Knights as the result of a trade on June 21, 2017 that ensured Vegas would select Jason Garrison in the 2017 NHL Expansion Draft from Tampa Bay in exchange for Nikita Gusev, a second-round pick in 2017 and this pick.
Tampa Bay previously acquired this pick as the result of a trade on March 1, 2017 that sent Mark Streit to Pittsburgh in exchange for this pick.
 The Minnesota Wild's fourth-round pick went to the Buffalo Sabres as the result of a trade on June 30, 2017 that sent Tyler Ennis, Marcus Foligno, and a third-round pick to Minnesota in exchange for Jason Pominville, Marco Scandella, and this pick.
 The Nashville Predators' fourth-round pick went to the Chicago Blackhawks as the result of a trade on February 26, 2018 that sent Ryan Hartman and a fifth-round pick in 2018 to Nashville in exchange for Victor Ejdsell, a first-round pick in 2018 and this pick.
 The Winnipeg Jets' fourth-round pick went to the Calgary Flames as the result of a trade on June 23, 2018 that sent a fourth-round pick in 2019 to Montreal in exchange for this pick.
Montreal previously acquired this pick as the result of a trade on February 26, 2018 that sent Joe Morrow to Winnipeg in exchange for this pick.
 The Vegas Golden Knights' fourth-round pick went to the Montreal Canadiens as the result of a trade on June 23, 2018 that sent Edmonton's fourth-round pick in 2018 (102nd overall) to San Jose in exchange for Florida's fifth-round pick in 2018 (139th overall) and this pick.
San Jose previously acquired this pick as the result of a trade on June 19, 2018 that sent Mike Hoffman and a seventh-round pick in 2018 to Florida in exchange for a fifth-round pick in 2018, a second-round pick in 2019 and this pick.
Florida previously acquired this pick as the result of a trade on June 21, 2017 that sent Reilly Smith to Vegas in exchange for this pick.

Round five

Notes
 The Arizona Coyotes' fifth-round pick went to the Philadelphia Flyers as the result of a trade on June 16, 2017 that sent Nick Cousins and Merrick Madsen to Arizona in exchange for Brendan Warren and this pick.
 The Detroit Red Wings' fifth-round pick went to the Pittsburgh Penguins as the result of a trade on October 21, 2017 that sent Scott Wilson and a third-round pick in 2018 to Detroit in exchange for Riley Sheahan and this pick.
 The Chicago Blackhawks' fifth-round pick went to the Nashville Predators as the result of a trade on February 26, 2018 that sent Victor Ejdsell and a first and fourth-round pick both in 2018 to Chicago in exchange for Ryan Hartman and this pick.
 The Edmonton Oilers' fifth-round pick went to the Montreal Canadiens as the result of a trade on June 23, 2018 that sent Washington's second-round pick in 2018 (62nd overall) to Edmonton in exchange for a third-round pick in 2018 (71st overall) and this pick.
 The Carolina Hurricanes' fifth-round pick went to the Vegas Golden Knights as the result of a trade on July 4, 2017 that sent Marcus Kruger to Carolina in exchange for this pick.
 The Calgary Flames' fifth-round pick went to the New Jersey Devils as the result of a trade on October 28, 2017 that sent Scott Wedgewood to Arizona in exchange for this pick.
Arizona previously acquired this pick as the result of a trade on February 20, 2017 that sent Michael Stone to Calgary in exchange for a third-round pick in 2017 and this pick (being conditional at the time of the trade). The condition – Arizona will receive a fifth-round pick in 2018 if Stone re-signs with Calgary for the 2017–18 NHL season – was converted on June 30, 2017.
 The Florida Panthers' fifth-round pick went to the Chicago Blackhawks as the result of a trade on June 23, 2018 that sent a fifth-round pick in 2019 to Montreal in exchange for this pick.
Montreal previously acquired this pick as the result of a trade on June 23, 2018 that sent Edmonton's fourth-round pick in 2018 (102nd overall) to San Jose in exchange for Vegas' fourth-round pick in 2018 (123rd overall) and this pick.
San Jose previously acquired this pick as the result of a trade on June 19, 2018 that sent Mike Hoffman and a seventh-round pick in 2018 to Florida in exchange for Vegas' fourth-round pick in 2018, a second-round pick in 2019 and this pick.
 The Columbus Blue Jackets' fifth-round pick went to the Arizona Coyotes as the result of a trade on June 23, 2018 that sent Calgary's third-round pick in 2018 (74th overall) to Chicago in exchange for Toronto's third-round pick in 2018 (87th overall) and this pick.
Chicago previously acquired this pick as the result of a trade on June 23, 2017 that sent Artemi Panarin, Tyler Motte and the Islanders' sixth-round pick in 2017 to Columbus in exchange for Brandon Saad, Anton Forsberg and this pick.
 The San Jose Sharks' fifth-round pick went to the Arizona Coyotes as the result of a trade on June 23, 2018 that sent Toronto's third-round pick in 2018 (87th overall) to San Jose in exchange for a fourth-round pick in 2018 (114th overall) and this pick.
 The Pittsburgh Penguins' fifth-round pick went to the Colorado Avalanche as the result of a trade on June 23, 2018 that sent Nashville's second-round pick in 2018 (58th overall) to Pittsburgh in exchange for Ottawa's third-round pick in 2018 (64th overall) and this pick.
 The Boston Bruins' fifth-round pick went to the Winnipeg Jets as the result of a trade on March 1, 2017 that sent Drew Stafford to Boston in exchange for this pick (being conditional at the time of the trade). The condition – Winnipeg will receive a fifth-round pick in 2018 if the Bruins reach the 2017 Stanley Cup playoffs and Stafford plays in half of Boston's remaining games in the 2016–17 NHL season – was converted on April 4, 2017.
 The Washington Capitals' fifth-round pick went to the Minnesota Wild as the result of a trade on June 14, 2017 that sent Tyler Graovac to Washington in exchange for this pick.

Round six

Notes
 The Buffalo Sabres' sixth-round pick went to the Toronto Maple Leafs as the result of a trade on June 23, 2018 that sent Toronto's sixth-round pick in 2019 to Buffalo in exchange for this pick.
 The Montreal Canadiens' sixth-round pick went to the Columbus Blue Jackets as the result of a trade on June 23, 2018 that sent a fifth-round pick in 2019 to Detroit in exchange for this pick.
Detroit previously acquired this pick as the result of a trade on February 28, 2017 that sent Steve Ott to Montreal in exchange for this pick.
 The Vancouver Canucks' sixth-round pick went to the Washington Capitals as the result of a trade on June 23, 2018 that sent a sixth-round pick in 2018 (186th overall) and a sixth-round pick in 2019 to Vancouver in exchange for this pick.
 The New York Islanders' sixth-round pick went to the Los Angeles Kings as the result of a trade on June 24, 2017 that sent a sixth-round pick in 2017 to New York in exchange for this pick.
 The Toronto Maple Leafs' sixth-round pick went to the Vegas Golden Knights as the result of a trade on October 6, 2017 that sent Calvin Pickard to Toronto in exchange for Tobias Lindberg and this pick.
 The Nashville Predators' sixth-round pick went to the San Jose Sharks as the result of a trade on February 25, 2018 that sent Brandon Bollig and Troy Grosenick to Nashville in exchange for this pick.
 The Washington Capitals' sixth-round pick went to the Vancouver Canucks as the result of a trade on June 23, 2018 that sent a sixth-round pick in 2018 (161st overall) to Washington in exchange for a sixth-round pick in 2019 and this pick.

Round seven

Notes
 The Montreal Canadiens' seventh-round pick was re-acquired as the result of a trade on June 23, 2018 that sent a seventh-round pick in 2019 to Philadelphia in exchange for this pick.
Philadelphia previously acquired this pick as the result of a trade on June 24, 2017 that sent a seventh-round pick in 2017 to Montreal in exchange for this pick.
 The New York Rangers' seventh-round pick went to the Ottawa Senators as the result of a trade July 18, 2016 that sent Mika Zibanejad and a second-round pick in 2018 to New York in exchange for Derick Brassard and this pick.
 The Los Angeles Kings' seventh-round pick went to the Tampa Bay Lightning as the result of a trade on May 31, 2017 that sent Bokondji Imama to Los Angeles in exchange for this pick (being conditional at the time of the trade). The condition – Tampa Bay will receive a seventh-round pick in 2018 if Los Angeles signs Imama prior to the June 1 deadline for drafted CHL players to sign by – was converted.
 The San Jose Sharks' seventh-round pick went to the Florida Panthers as the result of a trade on June 19, 2018 that sent Vegas' fourth-round pick in 2018, a fifth-round pick in 2018 and a second-round pick in 2019 to San Jose in exchange for Mike Hoffman and this pick.
 The Pittsburgh Penguins' seventh-round pick went to the Vegas Golden Knights as the result of a trade on June 23, 2018 that sent a seventh-round pick in 2019 to Pittsburgh in exchange for this pick.
 The Anaheim Ducks' seventh-round pick went to the Toronto Maple Leafs as the result of a trade January 10, 2017 that sent Jhonas Enroth to Anaheim in exchange for this pick.
 The Vegas Golden Knights' seventh-round pick went to the New York Rangers as the result of a trade on June 23, 2018 that sent Boston's seventh-round pick in 2019 to Carolina in exchange for this pick.
Carolina previously acquired this pick as the result of a trade on June 22, 2017 that sent Pittsburgh's second-round pick in 2017 to Vegas in exchange for Trevor van Riemsdyk and this pick.

Draftees based on nationality

North American draftees by state/province

See also
 2015–16 NHL transactions
 2016–17 NHL transactions
 2017–18 NHL transactions
 2018–19 NHL transactions
 2018–19 NHL season
 List of first overall NHL draft picks
 List of NHL players

References

External links
2018 NHL Entry Draft player stats at The Internet Hockey Database

Entry Draft
National Hockey League Entry Draft
2018 in sports in Texas
2010s in Dallas
2018 in Texas
Ice hockey in the Dallas–Fort Worth metroplex
NHL